

Events

Pre-1600
1513 – Having spotted land on March 27, Spanish explorer Juan Ponce de León comes ashore on what is now the U.S. state of Florida, landing somewhere between the modern city of St. Augustine and the mouth of the St. Johns River.

1601–1900
1755 – Commodore William James captures the Maratha fortress of Suvarnadurg on the west coast of India.
1792 – The Coinage Act is passed by Congress, establishing the United States Mint.
1800 – Ludwig van Beethoven leads the premiere of his First Symphony in Vienna.
1801 – French Revolutionary Wars: In the Battle of Copenhagen a British Royal Navy squadron defeats a hastily assembled, smaller, mostly-volunteer Dano-Norwegian Navy at high cost, forcing Denmark out of the Second League of Armed Neutrality.
1863 – American Civil War: The largest in a series of Southern bread riots occurs in Richmond, Virginia.
1865 – American Civil War: Defeat at the Third Battle of Petersburg forces the Army of Northern Virginia and the Confederate government to abandon Richmond, Virginia.
1885 – Canadian Cree warriors attack the village of Frog Lake, killing nine.

1901–present
1902 – Dmitry Sipyagin, Minister of Interior of the Russian Empire, is assassinated in the Mariinsky Palace, Saint Petersburg.
  1902   – "Electric Theatre", the first full-time movie theater in the United States, opens in Los Angeles.
1911 – The Australian Bureau of Statistics conducts the country's first national census.
1912 – The ill-fated  begins sea trials.
1917 – American entry into World War I: President Wilson asks the U.S. Congress for a declaration of war on Germany.
1921 – The Autonomous Government of Khorasan, a military government encompassing the modern state of Iran, is established.
1930 – After the mysterious death of Empress Zewditu, Haile Selassie is proclaimed emperor of Ethiopia.
1954 – A 19-month-old infant is swept up in the ocean tides at Hermosa Beach, California. Local photographer John L. Gaunt photographs the incident; 1955 Pulitzer winner "Tragedy by the Sea".
1956 – As the World Turns and The Edge of Night premiere on CBS. The two soaps become the first daytime dramas to debut in the 30-minute format.
1964 – The Soviet Union launches Zond 1.
1972 – Actor Charlie Chaplin returns to the United States for the first time since being labeled a communist during the Red Scare in the early 1950s.
1973 – Launch of the LexisNexis computerized legal research service.
1975 – Vietnam War: Thousands of civilian refugees flee from Quảng Ngãi Province in front of advancing North Vietnamese troops.
1976 – Prince Norodom Sihanouk resigns as leader of Cambodia and is placed under house arrest.
1979 – A Soviet bio-warfare laboratory at Sverdlovsk accidentally releases airborne anthrax spores, killing 66 plus an unknown amount of livestock. 
1980 – United States President Jimmy Carter signs the Crude Oil Windfall Profits Tax Act.
1982 – Falklands War: Argentina invades the Falkland Islands.
1986 – Alabama governor George Wallace, a former segregationist, best known for the "Stand in the Schoolhouse Door", announces that he will not seek a fifth four-year term and will retire from public life upon the end of his term in January 1987.
1989 – Soviet leader Mikhail Gorbachev arrives in Havana, Cuba, to meet with Fidel Castro in an attempt to mend strained relations.
1991 – Rita Johnston becomes the first female Premier of a Canadian province when she succeeds William Vander Zalm (who had resigned) as Premier of British Columbia.
1992 – In New York, Mafia boss John Gotti is convicted of murder and racketeering and is later sentenced to life in prison.
  1992   – Forty-two civilians are massacred in the town of Bijeljina in Bosnia and Herzegovina.
2002 – Israeli forces surround the Church of the Nativity in Bethlehem, into which armed Palestinians had retreated.
2004 – Islamist terrorists involved in the 11 March 2004 Madrid attacks attempt to bomb the Spanish high-speed train AVE near Madrid; the attack is thwarted.
2006 – Over 60 tornadoes break out in the United States; Tennessee is hardest hit with 29 people killed.
2012 – A mass shooting at Oikos University in California leaves seven people dead and three injured.
2014 – A spree shooting occurs at the Fort Hood army base in Texas, with four dead, including the gunman, and 16 others injured.
2015 – Gunmen attack Garissa University College in Kenya, killing at least 148 people and wounding 79 others.
  2015   – Four men steal items worth up to £200 million from an underground safe deposit facility in London's Hatton Garden area in what has been called the "largest burglary in English legal history."
2020 – COVID-19 pandemic: The total number of confirmed cases reach one million.
2021 – At least 49 people are killed in a train derailment in Taiwan after a truck accidentally rolls onto the track.
  2021   – A Capitol Police officer is killed and another injured when an attacker rams his car into a barricade outside the United States Capitol.

Births

Pre-1600
747 – Charlemagne, Frankish king (d. 814)
1473 – John Corvinus, Hungarian noble (d. 1504)
1545 – Elisabeth of Valois (d. 1568)
1565 – Cornelis de Houtman, Dutch explorer (d. 1599)
1586 – Pietro Della Valle, Italian traveler (d. 1652)

1601–1900
1602 – Mary of Jesus of Ágreda, Franciscan abbess (d. 1665)
1618 – Francesco Maria Grimaldi, Italian mathematician and physicist (d. 1663)
1647 – Maria Sibylla Merian, German-Dutch botanist and illustrator (d. 1717)
1653 – Prince George of Denmark (d. 1708)
1696 – Francesca Cuzzoni, Italian operatic soprano (d. 1778)
1719 – Johann Wilhelm Ludwig Gleim, German poet (d. 1803)
1725 – Giacomo Casanova, Italian explorer and author (d. 1798)
1788 – Francisco Balagtas, Filipino poet and author (d. 1862)
  1788   – Wilhelmine Reichard, German balloonist (d. 1848)
1789 – Lucio Norberto Mansilla, Argentinian general and politician (d. 1871)
1792 – Francisco de Paula Santander, Colombian general and politician, 4th President of the Republic of the New Granada (d. 1840)
1798 – August Heinrich Hoffmann von Fallersleben, German poet and academic (d. 1874)
1805 – Hans Christian Andersen, Danish novelist, short story writer, and poet (d. 1875)
1814 – Henry L. Benning, American general and judge (d. 1875)
  1814   – Erastus Brigham Bigelow, American inventor (d. 1879)
1827 – William Holman Hunt, English soldier and painter (d. 1910)
1835 – Jacob Nash Victor, American engineer (d. 1907)
1838 – Léon Gambetta, French lawyer and politician, 45th Prime Minister of France (d. 1882)
1840 – Émile Zola, French novelist, playwright, journalist (d. 1902)
1841 – Clément Ader, French engineer, designed the Ader Avion III (d. 1926)
1842 – Dominic Savio, Italian Catholic saint, adolescent student of Saint John Bosco (d. 1857)
1861 – Iván Persa, Slovenian priest and author (d. 1935)
1862 – Nicholas Murray Butler, American philosopher and academic, Nobel Prize laureate (d. 1947)
1869 – Hughie Jennings, American baseball player and manager (d. 1928)
1870 – Edmund Dwyer-Gray, Irish-Australian politician, 29th Premier of Tasmania (d. 1945)
1875 – Walter Chrysler, American businessman, founded Chrysler (d. 1940)
  1875   – William Donne, English cricketer and captain (d. 1942)
1884 – J. C. Squire, English poet, author, and historian (d. 1958)
1888 – Neville Cardus,  English cricket and music writer (d. 1975)
1891 – Jack Buchanan, Scottish entertainer (d. 1957)
  1891   – Max Ernst, German painter, sculptor, and poet (d. 1976)
  1891   – Tristão de Bragança Cunha, Indian nationalist and anti-colonial activist from Goa (d. 1958)
1896 – Johnny Golden, American golfer (d. 1936)
1898 – Harindranath Chattopadhyay, Indian poet, actor and politician (d. 1990)
  1898   – Chiungtze C. Tsen, Chinese mathematician (d. 1940)
1900 – Roberto Arlt, Argentinian journalist, author, and playwright (d. 1942)
  1900   – Anis Fuleihan, Cypriot-American pianist, composer, and conductor (d. 1970)
  1900   – Alfred Strange, English footballer (d. 1978)

1901–present
1902 – Jan Tschichold, German-Swiss graphic designer and typographer (d. 1974)
  1902   – Menachem Mendel Schneerson, the seventh Lubavitcher Rebbe (d. 1994)
1903 – Lionel Chevrier, Canadian lawyer and politician, 27th Canadian Minister of Justice (d. 1987)
1906 – Alphonse-Marie Parent, Canadian priest and educator (d. 1970)
1907 – Harald Andersson, American-Swedish discus thrower (d. 1985)
  1907   – Luke Appling, American baseball player and manager (d. 1991)
1908 – Buddy Ebsen, American actor and dancer (d. 2003)
1910 – Paul Triquet, Canadian general, Victoria Cross recipient (d. 1980)
  1910   – Chico Xavier, Brazilian spiritual medium (d. 2002)
1914 – Alec Guinness, English actor (d. 2000)
1919 – Delfo Cabrera, Argentinian runner and soldier (d. 1981)
1920 – Gerald Bouey, Canadian lieutenant and civil servant (d. 2004)
  1920   – Jack Stokes, English animator and director (d. 2013)
  1920   – Jack Webb, American actor, director, producer, and screenwriter (d. 1982)
1922 – John C. Whitehead, American banker and politician, 9th United States Deputy Secretary of State (d. 2015)
1923 – Gloria Henry,  actress (d. 2021)
  1923   – Johnny Paton, Scottish footballer, coach, and manager (d. 2015)
  1923   – G. Spencer-Brown, English mathematician, psychologist, and author (d. 2016)
1924 – Bobby Ávila, Mexican baseball player (d. 2004)
1925 – George MacDonald Fraser, Scottish author and screenwriter (d. 2008)
  1925   – Hans Rosenthal, German radio and television host (d. 1987)
1926 – Jack Brabham, Australian race car driver (d. 2014)
  1926   – Rudra Rajasingham, Sri Lankan police officer and diplomat (d. 2006)
1927 – Carmen Basilio, American boxer and soldier (d. 2012)
  1927   – Howard Callaway, American soldier and politician, 11th United States Secretary of the Army (d. 2014)
  1927   – Rita Gam, American actress (d. 2016)
  1927   – Billy Pierce, American baseball player and sportscaster (d. 2015)
  1927   – Kenneth Tynan, English author and critic (d. 1980)
1928 – Joseph Bernardin, American cardinal (d. 1996)
  1928   – Serge Gainsbourg, French singer-songwriter, actor, and director (d. 1991)
  1928   – Roy Masters, English-American radio host (d. 2021)
  1928   – David Robinson, Northern Irish horticulturist and academic (d. 2004)
1929 – Ed Dorn, American poet and educator (d. 1999)
1930 – Roddy Maude-Roxby, English actor
1931 – Keith Hitchins, American historian (d. 2020)
  1931   – Vladimir Kuznetsov, Russian javelin thrower (d. 1986)
1932 – Edward Egan, American cardinal (d. 2015)
1933 – György Konrád, Hungarian sociologist and author (d. 2019)
1934 – Paul Cohen, American mathematician and theorist (d. 2007)
  1934   – Brian Glover, English wrestler and actor (d. 1997)
  1934   – Carl Kasell, American journalist and game show host (d. 2018)
  1934   – Richard Portman, American sound engineer (d. 2017)
  1934   – Dovid Shmidel, Austrian-born Israeli rabbi
1936 – Shaul Ladany, Serbian-Israeli race walker and engineer
1937 – Dick Radatz, American baseball player (d. 2005)
1938 – John Larsson, Swedish 17th General of The Salvation Army
  1938   – Booker Little, American trumpet player and composer (d. 1961)
  1938   – Al Weis, American baseball player
1939 – Marvin Gaye, American singer-songwriter (d. 1984)
  1939   – Anthony Lake, American academic and diplomat, 18th United States National Security Advisor
  1939   – Lise Thibault, Canadian journalist and politician, 27th Lieutenant Governor of Quebec
1940 – Donald Jackson, Canadian figure skater and coach
  1940   – Mike Hailwood, English motorcycle racer (d. 1981)
  1940   – Penelope Keith, English actress 
1941 – Dr. Demento, American radio host
  1941   – Sonny Throckmorton, American country singer-songwriter 
1942 – Leon Russell, American singer-songwriter and pianist (d. 2016)
  1942   – Roshan Seth, Indian-English actor
1943 – Michael Boyce, Baron Boyce, South African-English admiral and politician, Lord Warden of the Cinque Ports (d. 2022)
  1943   – Caterina Bueno, Italian singer (d. 2007)
  1943   – Larry Coryell, American jazz guitarist (d. 2017)
  1943   – Antonio Sabàto, Sr., Italian actor (d. 2021)
1944 – Bill Malinchak, American football player
1945 – Jürgen Drews, German singer-songwriter 
  1945   – Guy Fréquelin, French race car driver
  1945   – Linda Hunt, American actress
  1945   – Reggie Smith, American baseball player and coach
  1945   – Don Sutton, American baseball player and sportscaster (d. 2021)
  1945   – Anne Waldman, American poet
1946 – Richard Collinge, New Zealand cricketer
  1946   – David Heyes, English politician
  1946   – Sue Townsend, English author and playwright (d. 2014)
  1946   – Kurt Winter, Canadian guitarist and songwriter (d. 1997)
1947 – Paquita la del Barrio, Mexican singer-songwriter
  1947   – Tua Forsström, Finnish writer
  1947   – Emmylou Harris, American singer-songwriter and guitarist
  1947   – Camille Paglia, American author and critic
1948 – Roald Als, Danish author and illustrator
  1948   – Dimitris Mitropanos, Greek singer (d. 2012)
  1948   – Daniel Okrent, American journalist and author
  1948   – Joan D. Vinge, American author
1949 – Paul Gambaccini, American-English radio and television host
  1949   – Bernd Müller, German footballer
  1949   – Pamela Reed, American actress
  1949   – David Robinson, American drummer 
1950 – Lynn Westmoreland, American politician
1951 – Ayako Okamoto, Japanese golfer
1952 – Lennart Fagerlund, Swedish cyclist
  1952   – Will Hoy, English race car driver (d. 2002)
  1952   – Leon Wilkeson, American bass player and songwriter  (d. 2001)
1953 – Jim Allister, Northern Irish lawyer and politician
  1953   – Rosemary Bryant Mariner, 20th and 21st-century U.S. Navy aviator (d. 2019) 
  1953   – Malika Oufkir, Moroccan Berber writer 
  1953   – Debralee Scott, American actress (d. 2005)
  1953   – James Vance, American author and playwright (d. 2017)
1954 – Gregory Abbott, American singer-songwriter and producer
  1954   – Donald Petrie, American actor and director
1955 – Michael Stone, Northern Irish loyalist paramilitary
1957 – Caroline Dean, English biologist and academic
  1957   – Hank Steinbrenner, American businessman (d. 2020)
1958 – Stefano Bettarello, Italian rugby player
  1958   – Larry Drew, American basketball player and coach
1959 – Gelindo Bordin, Italian runner
  1959   – David Frankel, American director, producer, and screenwriter
  1959   – Juha Kankkunen, Finnish race car driver
  1959   – Yves Lavandier, French director and producer
  1959   – Badou Ezzaki, Moroccan footballer and manager
1960 – Linford Christie, Jamaican-English sprinter
  1960   – Brad Jones, Australian race car driver
  1960   – Pascale Nadeau, Canadian journalist
1961 – Buddy Jewell, American singer-songwriter
  1961   – Christopher Meloni, American actor
  1961   – Keren Woodward, English singer-songwriter
1962 – Pierre Carles, French director and producer
  1962   – Billy Dean, American singer-songwriter and guitarist
  1962   – Clark Gregg, American actor
1963 – Karl Beattie, English director and producer
  1963   – Mike Gascoyne, English engineer
1964 – Pete Incaviglia, American baseball player and coach
  1964   – Jonathon Sharkey, American wrestler 
1965 – Rodney King, American victim of police brutality (d. 2012)
1966 – Bill Romanowski, American football player and actor
  1966   – Teddy Sheringham, English international footballer and coach
1967 – Greg Camp, American singer-songwriter and guitarist 
  1967   – Phil Demmel, American guitarist and songwriter
1969 – Ajay Devgn, Indian actor, director, and producer
1971 – Edmundo Alves de Souza Neto, Brazilian footballer
  1971   – Jason Lewry, English cricketer
  1971   – Todd Woodbridge, Australian tennis player and sportscaster
1972 – Eyal Berkovic, Israeli footballer
  1972   – Remo D'Souza, Indian choreographer and dancer
  1972   – Calvin Davis, American sprinter and hurdler
  1972   – Zane Lamprey, American actor, director, producer, and screenwriter
1973 – Dmitry Lipartov, Russian footballer
  1973   – Roselyn Sánchez, Puerto Rican-American actress
  1973   – Aleksejs Semjonovs, Latvian footballer
1974 – Tayfun Korkut, Turkish football manager and former player
1975 – Nate Huffman, American basketball player (d. 2015)
  1975   – Randy Livingston, American basketball player
  1975   – Katrin Rutschow-Stomporowski, German rower
  1975   – Pattie Mallette, Canadian author and film producer 
  1975   – Pedro Pascal, Chilean and American actor
1976 – Andreas Anastasopoulos, Greek shot putter
  1976   – Rory Sabbatini, South African golfer
1977 – Per Elofsson, Swedish skier
  1977   – Michael Fassbender, German-Irish actor and producer
  1977   – Hanno Pevkur, Estonian lawyer and politician, Estonian Minister of Justice
1980 – Avi Benedi, Israeli singer and songwriter
  1980   – Adam Fleming, Scottish journalist
  1980   – Gavin Heffernan, Canadian director and screenwriter
  1980   – Ricky Hendrick, American race car driver (d. 2004)
  1980   – Wairangi Koopu, New Zealand rugby league player
  1980   – Carlos Salcido, Mexican international footballer
1981 – Michael Clarke, Australian cricketer
  1981   – Kapil Sharma, Indian stand-up comedian, television presenter and actor
1982 – Marco Amelia, Italian footballer
  1982   – David Ferrer, Spanish tennis player
  1983   – Maksym Mazuryk, Ukrainian pole vaulter
1984 – Engin Atsür, Turkish basketball player
  1984   – Nóra Barta, Hungarian diver
  1984   – Jérémy Morel, French footballer
1985 – Thom Evans, Zimbabwean-Scottish rugby player
  1985   – Stéphane Lambiel, Swiss figure skater
1986 – Ibrahim Afellay, Dutch footballer
  1986   – Andris Biedriņš, Latvian basketball player
1987 – Pablo Aguilar, Paraguayan footballer
1988 – Jesse Plemons, American actor
1990 – Yevgeniya Kanayeva, Russian gymnast
  1990   – Miralem Pjanić, Bosnian footballer
1991 – Quavo, American rapper
1993 – Keshorn Walcott, Trinidadian javelin thrower
1994 – Pascal Siakam, Cameroonian basketball player
1997 – Dillon Bassett, American race car driver
  1997   – Abdelhak Nouri, Dutch footballer
  1997   – Austin Riley, American baseball player
2004 – Diana Shnaider, Russian tennis player
2007 – Brenda Fruhvirtová, Czech tennis player

Deaths

Pre-1600
 670 – Hasan ibn Ali the second Shia Imam (b. 624)
 870 – Æbbe the Younger, Frankish abbess
 872 – Muflih al-Turki, Turkish general
 968 – Yuan Dezhao, Chinese chancellor (b. 891)
 991 – Bardas Skleros, Byzantine general
1118 – Baldwin I, king of Jerusalem
1244 – Henrik Harpestræng, Danish botanical and medical author
1272 – Richard, 1st Earl of Cornwall, English husband of Sanchia of Provence (b. 1209)
1335 – Henry of Bohemia (b. 1265)
1412 – Ruy González de Clavijo, Spanish explorer and author
1416 – Ferdinand I, king of Aragon (b. 1379)
1502 – Arthur, prince of Wales (b. 1486)
1507 – Francis of Paola, Italian friar and saint, founded the Order of the Minims (b. 1416)
1511 – Bernard VII, Lord of Lippe, German nobleman (b. 1428)

1601–1900
1640 – Maciej Kazimierz Sarbiewski, Polish author and poet (b. 1595)
1657 – Ferdinand III, Holy Roman Emperor (b. 1608)
  1657   – Jean-Jacques Olier, French priest, founded the Society of Saint-Sulpice (b. 1608)
1672 – Pedro Calungsod, Filipino missionary and saint (b. 1654)
  1672   – Diego Luis de San Vitores, Spanish Jesuit missionary (b. 1627)
1720 – Joseph Dudley, English politician, Governor of the Province of Massachusetts Bay (b. 1647)
1742 – James Douglas, Scottish physician and anatomist (b. 1675)
1747 – Johann Jacob Dillenius, German-English botanist and mycologist (b. 1684)
1754 – Thomas Carte, English historian and author (b. 1686)
1787 – Thomas Gage, English general and politician, Governor of the Province of Massachusetts Bay (b. 1719)
1791 – Honoré Gabriel Riqueti, comte de Mirabeau, French journalist and politician (b. 1749)
1801 – Thomas Dadford, Jr., English engineer (b. 1761)
1803 – Sir James Montgomery, 1st Baronet, Scottish judge and politician (b. 1721)
1817 – Johann Heinrich Jung, German author and academic (b. 1740)
1827 – Ludwig Heinrich Bojanus, German physician and educator (b. 1776)
1845 – Philip Charles Durham, Scottish admiral and politician (b. 1763)
1865 – A. P. Hill, American general (b. 1825)
1872 – Samuel Morse, American painter and academic, invented the Morse code (b. 1791)
1891 – Albert Pike, American lawyer and general (b. 1809)
  1891   – Ahmed Vefik Pasha, Greek playwright and politician, 249th Grand Vizier of the Ottoman Empire (b. 1823)
1894 – Achille Vianelli, Italian painter and academic (b. 1803)
1896 – Theodore Robinson, American painter and academic (b. 1852)

1901–present
1914 – Paul Heyse, German author, poet, and translator, Nobel Prize laureate (b. 1830)
1917 – Bryn Lewis, Welsh international rugby player (b.1891)
1923 – Topal Osman, Turkish colonel (b. 1883)
1928 – Theodore William Richards, American chemist and academic, Nobel Prize laureate (b. 1868)
1930 – Zewditu I of Ethiopia (b. 1876)
1933 – Ranjitsinhji, Indian cricketer (b. 1872)
1936 – Jean Baptiste Eugène Estienne, French general (b. 1860)
1942 – Édouard Estaunié, French novelist (b. 1862)
1948 – Sabahattin Ali, Turkish journalist, author, and poet (b. 1907)
1953 – Hugo Sperrle, German field marshal (b. 1885)
1954 – Hoyt Vandenberg, US Air Force general (b. 1899)
1966 – C. S. Forester,  English novelist  (b. 1899)
1972 – Franz Halder, German general (b. 1884)
  1972   – Toshitsugu Takamatsu, Japanese martial artist and educator (b. 1887)
1974 – Georges Pompidou, French banker and politician, 19th President of France (b. 1911)
1977 – Walter Wolf, German academic and politician (b. 1907)
1987 – Buddy Rich, American drummer, songwriter, and bandleader (b. 1917)
1989 – Manolis Angelopoulos, Greek singer (b. 1939)
1992 – Juanito, Spanish footballer and manager (b. 1954)
  1992   – Jan van Aartsen, Dutch politician (b. 1909)
1994 – Betty Furness, American actress, consumer advocate, game show panelist, television journalist and television personality (b. 1916)
  1994   – Marc Fitch, British historian and philanthropist (b. 1908)
1995 – Hannes Alfvén, Swedish physicist and engineer, Nobel Prize laureate (b. 1908)
1997 – Tomoyuki Tanaka, Japanese director and producer (b. 1910)
1998 – Rob Pilatus, American-German singer-songwriter (b. 1965)
2001 – Charles Daudelin, Canadian sculptor and painter (b. 1920)
2002 – Levi Celerio, Filipino composer and songwriter (b. 1910)
  2002   – John R. Pierce, American engineer and author (b. 1910)
2003 – Edwin Starr, American singer-songwriter (b. 1942)
2004 – John Argyris, Greek computer scientist, engineer, and academic (b. 1913)
2005 – Lillian O'Donnell, American crime novelist (b. 1926)
  2005   – Pope John Paul II (b. 1920)
2006 – Lloyd Searwar, Guyanese anthologist and diplomat (b. 1925)
2007 – Henry L. Giclas, American astronomer and academic (b. 1910)
2008 – Yakup Satar, Turkish World War I veteran(b. 1898)
2009 – Albert Sanschagrin, Canadian bishop (b. 1911)
  2009   – Bud Shank, American saxophonist and flute player (b. 1926)
2010 – Chris Kanyon, American wrestler (b. 1970)
2011 – John C. Haas, American businessman and philanthropist (b. 1918)
2012 – Jesús Aguilarte, Venezuelan captain and politician (b. 1959)
  2012   – Elizabeth Catlett, American-Mexican sculptor and illustrator (b. 1915)
  2012   – Mauricio Lasansky, American graphic designer and academic (b. 1914)
2013 – Fred, French author and illustrator (b. 1931)
  2013   – Jesús Franco, Spanish director, screenwriter, producer, and actor (b. 1930)
  2013   – Milo O'Shea, Irish-American actor (b. 1926)
2014 – Urs Widmer, Swiss author and playwright (b. 1938)
2015 – Manoel de Oliveira, Portuguese actor, director, producer, and screenwriter (b. 1908)
  2015   – Robert H. Schuller, American pastor and author (b. 1926)
  2015   – Steve Stevaert, Belgian businessman and politician, Governor of Limburg (b. 1954)
2016 – Gallieno Ferri, Italian comic book artist and illustrator (b. 1929)
  2016   – Robert Abajyan, Armenian sergeant (b. 1996)
2017 – Alma Delia Fuentes, Mexican actress (b. 1937)
2021 – Simon Bainbridge, British composer (b. 1952)
2022 – Estelle Harris, American actress and comedian (b. 1928)

Holidays and observances
 Christian feast day:
Abundius of Como
Amphianus of Lycia
Æbbe the Younger
Bronach of Glen-Seichis (Irish martyrology)
Francis of Paola
Francisco Coll Guitart
Henry Budd (Anglican Church of Canada)
Nicetius of Lyon
Pedro Calungsod
Theodosia of Tyre
Urban of Langres
April 2 (Eastern Orthodox liturgics)
International Children's Book Day (International)
Thai Heritage Conservation Day (Thailand)
Unity of Peoples of Russia and Belarus Day (Belarus)
World Autism Awareness Day (International)

References

Bibliography

External links

 BBC: On This Day
 
 Historical Events on April 2

Days of the year
April